The Schenck House (built 1822) is one of the earliest extant homes currently within the City of Buffalo limits. It was built by early pioneer and farmer Michael Schenck (1772–1844) and his son Samuel Schenck (November 17, 1793 – December 1, 1872) out of locally quarried limestone, where many fossils can be seen on the eastern side of the facade. The Schenck family dates back to 1709 when they first arrived in America in an effort to escape religious persecution for being Anabaptist, specifically Mennonite. Just over a hundred years later they would find themselves in two covered wagons, traversing the Allegheny Mountains, and settling at the border between the City of Buffalo and Town of Amherst. There they practiced the same farming techniques they had in Pennsylvania and earlier in Germany. These techniques by today’s standards could be termed "environmentally friendly" and polyculture due to their use of crop rotation, production of multiple food products on a family farm, and the use of cow manure. The Schencks like other German settlers practiced the keeping and feeding of multiple types of animals, housing them in a barn through winter. This practice was considered unusual by farmers of British heritage. While the German idea of feeding and housing animals through winter was adopted by non-German farmers in the 19th century, the keeping of a variety of animals was not. Many 19th-century farmers began to develop specialized farms, unofficially becoming a "pig farmer" or "cattle rancher".  Three generations of Schencks continued practicing polyculture of crops and animals even when monoculture continued to expand and “special” or synthetic fertilizers were being developed and used.

The property was originally part of the Hamlet of Snyder, in the Town of Amherst and continued to be when the family sold it to the Country Club of Buffalo in 1898. The Country Club kept the original buildings except for a cottage – northwest of the main stone house – where Samuel Schenck’s mother Catherine Schenck lived. They added a tennis court, polo field, large club house, garages and a 16-hole golf course. The golf course was completed in 1902. The property was rezoned in the 1920s when it was sold to the City of Buffalo. It became a public park and golf course called Grover Cleveland Golf Course. It was transferred again in the 1970s, this time to Erie County; however, the property remained within the city limits. Around 1970, the large barn and significantly smaller structure were demolished. The Schenck house currently has three of the original six buildings and roughly 180 acres of the original acres surviving to 2016. The 2003 Master Plan developed by Erie County has stated that it is looking at filing for preservation status. The three remaining buildings, in addition to census, church and other records, show that the architecture, farming techniques and religious preferences of the Schencks were of a distinctly Pennsylvania German-Swiss (also called Pennsylvanian Dutch) heritage and culture. They were part of a wave of immigrants that arrived in the Niagara County (later divided into Niagara & Erie County) during the pre-civil war era. Many of the immigrants from Pennsylvania did not live in isolated communities and instead built homes and lived among people from a variety of places of origin. The Friends of Schenck House work with and support Erie County and the 2003 Master Plan to restore the second oldest building in the City of Buffalo.
"Another notable “heritage” aspect of the Grover Cleveland Golf Course is that the site has one of the oldest stone buildings in Erie County on it, possibly dating back as early as the 1810s. This structure is currently used for limited offices and storage for the golf course operations, and is in need of upgrades to preserve its structural and architectural integrity." Eire Country 2003 Master Plan, Section 4
"The old stone house is also one for the history books. Records show that it is one of the oldest structures of its kind in Erie County, possibly dating back as far as the 1810s. This property was originally a large farm / estate, which was acquired by the Country Club of Buffalo who was forced to move from their Nottingham Terrace (North Buffalo) location to make way for the Pan-American Exposition of 1901." Eire Country 2003 Master Plan, Section 4
Actions prescribed by Eire Country 2003 Master Plan, Section 4
"Consider the inclusion of the stone house and outbuildings on the National Register of Historic Places. Consider a public/private partnership in restoring the old stone house structure and associated out-buildings. Potential exists for a heritage-related museum, restaurant, upgraded golf course-related facility, meeting rooms, etc. Maximize the access and visibility to Main Street, the proximity to the University at Buffalo and the close proximity to some of the region’s most prestigious homes as major marketing    advantages for future uses at this facility."

First settlers

Samuel Schenck was 28 years old when he emigrated with his parents Michael and Catherine Schenck in two covered wagons from Lancaster, Pennsylvania, to the Buffalo, New York, area in 1821. It is likely he emigrated with his first wife Sarah Hoopart Schenck (July 23, 1798 to March 14, 1823) and at least one of his two sons—Jacob and John—based on birth and death recorded on their gravestones.  The Schencks were from Lancaster, Pennsylvania. The Conestoga wagon was a water tight overland vehicle that was designed to cross both rough road and float across rivers. This design is useful for cross the mountains and rivers that would have been barriers on the road from Lancaster and Pittsburgh, PA to Buffalo and Amherst, NY in the 1820s.

“Michael Schenck emigrated from Pennsylvania in August 1821 with his family in two large covered wagons, drawn by four horses, came by way of Pittsburgh, over the mountain to Erie, thence to a point then called Comstock’s, eight miles from Buffalo, where he was compelled to place eight horses to one wagon, in order to get to Buffalo, on account of bad roads, he settled in Amherst, and purchased one-half section of land at fifteen dollars per acre, near Snyder post-office, then heavy timber land.”  

1827 map showing the overland routes to Buffalo and Amherst, NY, The Schencks took a route from Pittsburgh to Erie, PA then following the road along the water front that is roughly where Route 5 is today - by Carey & Lea, New York State - Buffalo at this time is spelled "Buffaloe".
 Timothy Dwight - a traveler in 1804  states the following, "The only villages, which it contains, are Batavia and 'Buffaloe' creek... Within the [indigenous persons] reservation is included the ground, opposite to Black Rock;... Buffalo creek, otherwise called New Amsterdam, is built on the North-Eastern border of a considerable mill-stream, which bears the same name... The village is built half a mile from the mouth of the creek; and consists of about twenty indifferent houses...We saw about as many Indians in this village, as white people... [Since our journey in 1804 ] The village of Buffaloe was burned down during the late war. Since that period it has been re-built, and is now a beautiful and flouring town of one hundred and fifty houses - PUB 1820. Beyond this hamlet a handsome point stretches to the South-west; and furnished an imperfect shelter to the vessels, employed in the commerce of the lake. Seven of the vessels, (five schooners, a sloop and a pettiaugre) lay in the harbor at this time." :New England and New York 1822 page 66 

The Schencks arrived on the cusp of a migration of British, European and American settlers into the “Greater Buffalo Region" in Western New York. City of Buffalo saw its non-indigenous population increase from 2,095 in the year 1820 to 42,470 in 1850. The Town of Amherst saw a similar rate of increase from 262 in 1820 to 4,453 in 1850. More specifically, the Schencks were part of a migration of German-Swiss Pennsylvanians along with people newly emigrated from Germany between the 1820s to the 1850s into the Town of Amherst and City of Buffalo. The Town of Amherst had 1,556 German and 364 Pennsylvanians arrive by the year 1850, or 43% of the total population. The City of Buffalo had 9,409 Germans, 69 Prussians and 376 Pennsylvanians by 1850, or 23% of the population.  Each Federal census cycle the Schencks had male and female farmhands or laborers who were born in Germany listed as living in their household. Due to this, it is possible that the Schencks were bilingual.

Architecture
The house has had some alteration over its history, most of which was in the 19th century and included a front porch and two-story rear addition. The construction of the Schenck House was likely started in June 1822, when Michael Schenck purchased the property for $1000, and completed in August 1823, when Michael sold it to his eldest son Samuel Schenck for $3500. The Schenck House was built with a “Continental Pennsylvania German House” (CPGH) floor plan of three rooms over three rooms, without a Federal style “central entrance hall”, plus additional windows set into the third floor for functional light. Traditionally, this style would include a central chimney on a stone or brick central support wall. Further investigation is needed to determine if the two interior chimneys at either end of the house were original to the house. The Continental Pennsylvania German House plan was brought over to America with immigrants in the 17th and 18th century and dates to the Middle Ages in Central Europe. A comparable extant house is the -story Immel House in the State of Pennsylvania; three interior rooms over three, three exterior bays by two deep, with a central chimney and additional windows set into the gable end of the half story.

The exterior of  the Schenck house is in the “Pennsylvania German Traditional” (PGT) style pre-1830s due to the asymmetry of the front door. It is noted that the “four over four” [four exterior bays over four] was first used with an asymmetrical front entrance as is the Schenck House, and then by the 1830s either PGT symmetrical (two matching doors) front entrance or English Federal style single door central bay front entrance. The  Green House is an example of Vernacular style.

Cooking in an 1823 house would have involved using the fireplace and in the case of the Schencks a 10 plate stove and pipe. A "5 plate stove" or German Jamb stove was a cast-iron free-standing stove developed in German speaking regions in the 1550s A.D.. However, it was used for heating the sleeping and sitting areas of the first floor of the house. The kitchen was heated by the kitchen fireplace. Once in America German immigrants developed a 6 plate  Six Plate stove (history) or closed stove which was cooked on by the 1740s. Benjamin Franklin is also an inventor of a coal burning stove in 1741, Franklin stove.  However, it was not free-standing and was inserted into the fireplace.

Items found in Michael Schenck's 1844 inventory that relate to food preparation included the following: One ten plate stove & Pipe, 1 kitchen cupboard & crockery, 1 table, settee (possibly Pennsylvanian German style), elbow chair, Ironware and hooks. The inventory is short and lacks all personal items.

The inventory includes both a ten-plate stove which would allow enough space for two pots and a small oven. However, it also included ironware and hooks for cooking over the fireplace. This is in comparison to Susannah Schenck Lapp who grew up in the Schenck House and then resided there with her husband John Lapp in the 1880s and 1890s. Despite many changes in technology in the 19th century, the presence of "a lot of chains" in the kitchen may relate to her either still using the fireplace for some cooking, or were for seasonal use when apple butter making in heavy kettles. The following kitchen items were inventoried at the Schenck House and probated on March 15, 1895.
 4 tables - $2.50
 1 Iron Kettle  - $1.00
 a lot of chains - $0.50
 2 Brass Kettles - $1.00
 a lot of stone jars, jugs & Butter - $0.25
 3 oil Cans - $0.50
 1 Churn - $0.25
 1 Scale and Baking Mould $0.50
 1 Copper Kettle - $1.50
 a lot of fruit jars/jams - $0.75
 1 sink - $0.10
 a lot of dishes, knives & forks - $0.50
 1 Coal Stove - $2.00
 1 Bench - $0.10
 1 old Cupboard - $0.10
 9 Cans Fruit - $0.45
 6 old Bags - $0.25
 Table spread - x

Outbuildings
The surviving outbuildings include a red brick, two room building with a loft used either as a SpringHouse or summer kitchen. The duel interior end chimneys and proximity to the main house supports a function in conjunction with the kitchen of the main house. This is likely to be where the dairy butter, apple butter and cider were being processed. A second outbuilding in the form of a -story small barn with the roof extended to create a side stall without exterior walls was possibly either a Combination Structure  or a small animal shelter where the sheep or swine were kept. The Non-population agriculture registers show the farming of swine and sheep.  Two other structures, the barn which had a fore structure perpendicular to the main barn and a small building between the main house and barn, can be found on a 1927 blueprint of the lot.

Farming techniques and practices
Samuel and his second wife Magdalena Schenck farmed the land from roughly 1823 to 1872. From 1860 to 1872, Samuel Schenck was infirmed, and described as disabled in surrogate court records, while Magdalena managed the farm and farm hands. She continued the management until her death in 1887. Samuel and Magdalana’s daughter Susannah Schenck Lapp and her husband John Lapp moved to the farm in the 1880s and continued to manage the farm until 1895 when Susannah, having been paralyzed from a stroke, died. Susannah’s son and daughter Barbara, having leased the fields from their parents since the 1980s, continued farming in the same fashion as their grandparents through to about 1900.

Work was divided with the men plowing, sowing and harvesting the fields along with managing the cattle. The women managed the orchard, beekeeping and milking of the cows and produced apples, apple butter, apple cider, and dairy butter. It is unknown if it was the men or women who managed the swine and sheep.

Census records point to Samuel Schenck utilizing traditional farming technologies that were brought over by the German and Swiss settlers, which include crop rotation, co-planting, housing and feeding cattle and animals in cold winter months, barns with stalls, large wagons for transporting hay, and the growing of hay.

The non-population Federal census taken in 1850 and 1870 plus the NYS census taken in 1855 demonstrate a farming style utilizing both polyculture and crop rotation as opposed to the monoculture that was more commonly used by early English settlers. Polyculture is a modern term; however, the co-planting, and planting of multiple types of food products on the same farm has been utilized by Central Europeans since the Middle Ages. The use of a polyculture system along with crop rotation allowed for higher nutrition and for the land to replace nutrients.(citation)

The 1855 NYS census gives an account on how the farm land was used. The farm was divided into plowed, fallow, pasture and meadow zones. The plowed land was further divided. Products produced from seed in 1854 included; winter wheat, oats, Barley, buckwheat, corn, and Irish potatoes. The orchard produced 150 bushels of apples, and 2 barrels of cider were made. The meadow produced 10 tons of hay plus a half bushel of grass seed was harvested. Additionally, 11 acres were allowed to sit fallow - were not used, allowing weeds and grass to grow. This last point is notable because six of the Schenck’s immediate neighbors who were not of German or Pennsylvanian German heritage did not have any recorded land left to fallow.

The livestock according to both the 1850 and 1870 Federal and 1855 NY State census included the production of butter and honey. For 1850, 1855 and 1870 the farm produced 150, 300 and 520 pounds of butter from 2, 3 and then 5 cows. During these years 50–75 pounds of honey were produced from beekeeping. The Schencks did not have working oxen or mules, but did have 4 horses. They also kept 4-14 swine for all three of the census years and 2 sheep. In 1850, there was an apparent attempt to grow sweet potatoes in Western NY, 4 bushels were harvested, the number of acres sown is unknown. The sweat potatoes were not grown in 1855 or 1870.

In the November 13, 1874, surrogates court papers in regards to the year her husband died in 1872, Magdalena states, "I was managing the farm when husband [sic] died. There was a little grain raised the year he died. There was a little oats & some wheat, some straw, maybe 2 tons - there was 2 or 3 loads - there was a few apples - 10 or 15 bushels - Graag was made some cider [sic] - do[n't] know how much. Don't know how many potatoes there was but there was enough to last us though the winter 20 or 25 bushels. We had a couple 'mipes' [mingle] of Turnips & a four [bushels] cabbages,...1 bbl apple butter. There were some grain bags on the farm, 6 of them were petty good....[six] were old and poor."

It has been observed by early travelers how farming techniques varied from region to region. Lancaster, Pennsylvania, where Samuel Schenck was born and raised drew considerable attention, and Lancaster, PA system was recorded in detail. It is noted that the crops produced on Samuel Schenck’s farm in Snyder, New York, happen to also be mentioned to be used in rotation in Lancaster.

“Schoeps found that “usual practice” in Bucks County in 1783 was to plant maize the first year, wheat and English grass the second year, then to pasture for four or five years. Sometimes, he added, buckwheat or turnips were planted after wheat before the ground was allowed to lie fallow. Cazenove in his Journal gives a very complete picture of crop rotation in various parts of Pennsylvania in 1794. Around Bethlehem, wheat was sowed the first year followed by oats, corn, or buckwheat in the second year, clover the third year, and clover and plowed to sow in the fourth. … In Cumberland County, no “consistant [sic][or] very well thought-out” crop rotation was practiced, and the farmers “followed too much their humor,” but good farmers, on good land, sowed wheat the first year, after thrice plowing the land, oats or corn the second year, and clover and fallow the third and fourth years. … A travel account of 1794, which indicated that Lancaster County was the best cultivated of any part of Pennsylvania, gave the following account of rotation there: the first crop, Indian corn, was planted in late May or early June, was harvested in the fall in time to sow the second crop, [winter] wheat. In the spring of the second year, before the wheat sowed the previous fall had been harvested, clover was sowed among the wheat. After the wheat was reaped in late summer, a few cattle were turned into the now ripe clover for a short time. In the third and fourth years, clover was sowed, and was mowed twice in each year. After the last mowing in Autumn of the fourth year, the ground was plowed and harrowed, and in May of the fifth year the cycle was begun again with Indian corn. Occasionally, rye or winter barley was substituted for wheat, and oats for Indian corn, in which case the oats were sowed in April. Frequently, buckwheat was sowed in June on a field containing wheat to be harvested in late summer, the buckwheat being reaped just before the November Frost.” German Agriculture in Pennsylvania, 1959, page 202.

Based on census records, Samuel likely planted potatoes, “Indian corn” and oats in the spring and winter wheat and winter barley in the fall. He is not recorded as producing clover, but instead was producing 10–18 tons of hay plus seed. The production of hay, combined with the a surviving 1927 blueprint of a barn as large or larger than the house, eludes to Schenck both housing and feeding his cattle and horses through the winter months rather than penning or sending them into the woods or field in the coldest months.

The housing and feeding of cattle and farm animals through the coldest months was introduced by the German, Swiss and Dutch farmers. This was not typically practices in England, Ireland and Scotland.

“the Germans differed from practically all other Pennsylvania farmers, with the exception of the few Dutch, in providing shelter for their animals in winter. A traveler of the mid-eighteenth century noted shortly after his arrival in Pennsylvania that cattle around Philadelphia were neither housed in winter nor tended in the fields; after having been in the country for some time, however, he remarked that while the English and Swedes had no stables, the Germans and Dutch had “preserved the custom of their country, and generally kept their cattle in barns during the winter…. They kept their animals as warm as possible in winter, and thereby effected considerable savings in hay and grain, for they found that cold animals eat more than warm ones…. the Germans began to build large barns rather than houses. The attention paid by Germans to the construction of barns, which became the envy of the non-German countryside, was brought out by one observer of 1753, who commented that “It is pretty to behold our back-settlements, where the barns are large as palaces, while the owners live in log huts; a sign tho’ of thriving farmers….The vegetable gardens were filled with weeds, intermingled with cabbages, turnips, and other plants." German Agriculture in Pennsylvania, 1959, page 197.

See also
 Snyder, New York
 Buffalo, New York

References

 Lapp-Rigel Farm (Contemporary 1830s Pennsylvanian German-Swiss Farm)
 Coit House

Houses in Buffalo, New York
History of Buffalo, New York
Pennsylvania Dutch culture